Mahoraise music is the music of the island of Mayotte, a French island located in the Mozambique Channel of the Indian Ocean. The principal musical genres which encompass Mahoraise are Mgodro, Blues, Traditional music, Gaboussi, and Chakacha

Mahorais groups and singers

Groups 
 Alpha Djo 
 Les Rapaces

Singers 
 M'toro Chamou
 Mikidache
 Baco
 Rekman Seller
 Saandati Moussa
 Zily
 Jean-Raymond Cudza
 Boura Mahiya
 Zama Colo
 Del Zid
 Mado
 Baco Ali
 Lima Wild
 Komo
 Bob Mursala
 Bo Houss
 Terrel Elymoor 
 Langa
 Vélou Moirabou
 Babadi
 Edmond Bébé
 Anfane Lewis
 Lady Lova

Music Body Report 
 Colo Mangara
 Mariame Kanlangaga  
Riziki Mtsounga  
 Jeff Ridjali 
 Henry Said Henry

Spiritual Worlds 
 Maoulida 
 Dahira
 Shigoma
 Madjilisse
 Manzaraka

References 

Mahoran culture
Music of French subdivisions